Events from the year 1741 in Austria

Incumbents
 Monarch – Maria Theresa

Events

 
 Battle of Mollwitz
 Trenck's Pandurs

Births

Deaths

 
 
 
 May 5th – Eleonore von Schwarzenberg, a princess of Schwarzenberg (b. 1682).

References

 
 Years of the 18th century in Austria